The first USS Columbia of the United States Navy to be commissioned was a three-masted, wooden-hulled sailing frigate, built at the Washington Navy Yard and carrying 54 guns (an earlier Columbia was destroyed during the burning of Washington in 1814 whilst it was still under construction). Her keel was laid in 1825, but as was typical of much Navy construction during this period, she was not launched until much later, on 9 March 1836.

On her first cruise, from May 1838 – June 1840 with Lieutenant George A. Magruder in command, Columbia rounded the Cape of Good Hope to become flagship of Commodore George C. Read in the East India Squadron. She returned to the United States by way of Cape Horn, becoming one of the first U.S. naval ships to circumnavigate the globe. She participated in the 1838 Second Sumatran Expedition in response to a Maylay attack on an American merchant vessel.

Columbia served as flagship of the Home Squadron from January–May 1842; cruised on Brazil Squadron from July 1842 – February 1844 and in the Mediterranean Squadron from May–December 1844. She returned to the Brazil Squadron as flagship from November 1845 – October 1847, and was placed in ordinary at Norfolk Navy Yard upon her return home. Except for a cruise as flagship of the Home Squadron from January 1853 – March 1855, she remained at Norfolk until the outbreak of the American Civil War. Columbia was scuttled and burned by Union forces to avoid her capture by Confederates upon the surrender of Norfolk Navy Yard on 21 April 1861. Following the close of the war she was raised and sold at Norfolk on 10 October 1867.

See also
 Glossary of nautical terms (A-L)
 Glossary of nautical terms (M-Z)
 List of sailing frigates of the United States Navy

References

External links
 
 Journal of the U.S.S. Columbia and U.S.S. Mississippi, 1843–1846 MS 272 held by Special Collection & Archives, Nimitz Library at the United States Naval Academy
 Watch, Quarter, and Station Bill of the U.S.S. Columbia, 1844–1907 (bulk 1844) MS 77 held by Special Collection & Archives, Nimitz Library at the United States Naval Academy
 

	

Sailing frigates of the United States Navy
Ships built in the District of Columbia
Ships of the Union Navy
1836 ships
Shipwrecks of the American Civil War
Shipwrecks of the Virginia coast
Ship fires
Scuttled vessels
Maritime incidents in April 1861